Uvelsky is a rural locality (a settlement) and the administrative center of Uvelsky District, Chelyabinsk Oblast, Russia. Population:

References

Notes

Sources

Rural localities in Chelyabinsk Oblast